Deepu Karunakaran is an Indian film director who works in Malayalam cinema. He debuted in direction with movie "Winter", but as the release was late due to many reasons, his first movie came in theatre was in 2008 with the Dileep starrer Crazy Gopalan.

Career

Prior to becoming an independent filmmaker, Deepu apprenticed as an assistant director under Priyadarshan. His first released film was in 2008, the thriller comedy Crazy Gopalan starring Dileep in the titular role. The movie opened to commercial success. His first made film horror thriller "Winter" with Jayaram in the lead was released subsequently. His third film was comedy entertainer Teja Bhai and Family  starring Prithviraj in the lead, released in 2011 to commercial success. He directed Mammootty in the 2015 thriller Fireman, which was a success critically and commercially. His 5th movie Karinkunnam 6s, a sports movie with Manju Warrier in the lead, was released in 2016.

Personal life

Deepu Karunakaran is married to Archana Mohan. The couple were married in Trivandrum on 17 January 2015. He is also the brother of actress Suchitra Murali.

Filmography

References

External links 

Living people
Film directors from Thiruvananthapuram
Malayalam film directors
21st-century Indian film directors
1977 births